Jual Oram (born 22 March 1961) is a member of the 17th Lok Sabha of India. He represents the Sundargarh constituency of Odisha. He is a member of the Bharatiya Janata Party (BJP).

He was also a member of the 12th, 13th, 14th Lok Sabha and 16th Lok Sabha. He was chosen as one of the Cabinet Ministers of Prime Minister Narendra Modi. He is a former Cabinet Minister in the Government of India. He is now the Vice-President of the Bharatiya Janata Party and is one of the party's senior most leaders from the State of Odisha, being one of two founding Legislative Assembly Members from BJP in the state of Odisha. He has served as the president of BJP in the state of Odisha for over four years. He served as leader of opposition party from BJP side in Odisha legislative assembly. He is now serving as the chairman of the parliamentary committee on defence.

Early life
Oram was born on 22 March 1961 into a poor tribal family at the village of Kendudihi, Sundergarh district, Orissa (present-day Odisha) to Dilga and Bhutuki Oram. He received a diploma in Electrical Engineering from Utkalmani Gopabandhu Institute of Engineering. Before entering politics, he was employed as an assistant foreman in Bharat Heavy Electricals Limited. In an interview to The Telegraph (Calcutta), Oram said that he would have continued his job in the organization if he had not entered politics.

Political career
In 1989, Oram joined Bharatiya Janata Party. He was elected to the Odisha Legislative Assembly from Bonai constituency in the following year and served for two terms until 1998. He served as the party's national vice-president for the BJP ST Morcha (Scheduled Tribes wing) between 1993 and 1995. After serving two years as national secretary of the party, he was appointed party president for the state unit in 1997 and remained in that position until 1999.

In 1998, Oram was elected to the Lok Sabha from Sundargarh constituency. He was re-elected to the parliament in the following year. After Prime Minister Atal Bihari Vajpayee created the Ministry of Tribal Affairs, he was sworn as its first ever minister on 13 October.

In 2004, Oram was re-elected as party president for the state unit and served for two years. On 17 May of the same year, he was re-elected to the Lok Sabha for the third time from his constituency. From 2006 to 2009, he served as the party's national vice-president.

Oram lost from his Sundargarh constituency in 2009. On 22 December 2009, he was made the party president of the state unit for the third time. In July 2012, he alleged that former Chief Minister of Odisha Hemananda Biswal had forged his caste certificate. On 1 April 2013, he was appointed vice president of the party.

On 18 May 2014, Oram was re-elected to the Lok Sabha from the Sundargarh constituency after defeating Dilip Tirkey of the Biju Janata Dal. He was also the only candidate of Bharatiya Janata Party to win from Odisha. On 26 May, he took oath as the Tribal Affairs minister in the Narendra Modi ministry. In the following month, he announced that the central government would create a tribal map of India which would help in introducing new projects and schemes for the tribals.

In 2015, Oram stoked a controversy by equating Sarnaism with Hinduism.  Carrying black flags and banners, nearly 300 tribals gathered around the state guesthouse in Ranchi on 31 October and demanded an apology from him for allegedly hurting their sentiments.

Personal life
On 8 March 1987, he married Jhingia Oram and they have two daughters.

See also
 Indian general election, 2014 (Odisha)
 Indian general election, 2009 (Odisha)

References

External links

|-

|-

|-

 www.jualoram.com 
 Members of Fourteenth Lok Sabha – Parliament of India website

1961 births
Living people
India MPs 1998–1999
India MPs 1999–2004
India MPs 2004–2009
India MPs 2014–2019
India MPs 2019–present
Lok Sabha members from Odisha
People from Odisha
Bharatiya Janata Party politicians from Odisha
People from Sundergarh district
Ministers of Tribal Affairs (India)
Narendra Modi ministry